Irv Wyner (September 4, 1904 – November 8, 2002) was a background artist who was most associated with the theatrical Looney Tunes animated shorts, in Friz Freleng's unit.  His first credited work was on the 1952 animated short Gift Wrapped, a Sylvester and Tweety cartoon, and he stayed with Freleng's unit until 1957 (where his last credited work was on the one-shot cartoon Three Little Bops), when he was briefly succeeded by Boris Gorelick, and later by Tom O'Loughlin.

In the early 1960s, Irv did work for Disney on Disneyland, Walter Lantz, and later, in the 1970s, for Chuck Jones's Sib Tower 12 for such specials as The Phantom Tollbooth, Horton Hears a Who!, and Rikki-Tikki-Tavi, among others.

External links
 

American film score composers
American male film score composers
Background artists
1904 births
2002 deaths
Warner Bros. Cartoons people
Walt Disney Animation Studios people
Walter Lantz Productions people
20th-century American composers
20th-century American male musicians
Walter Lantz